The Dornier Do E was a small German flying boat of 1924, designed for reconnaissance missions.

Development
Conceptually, the Do E was very similar to the successful Dornier Wal, but smaller and single-engined. It was of all-metal construction, with a parasol wing that was attached by struts to a wide, shallow hull. The hull had a single step and stability on the water was ensured by the characteristic Dornier sponsons. The single engine was installed on top of the wing centre section, driving a tractor propeller.

The crew accommodation consisted of an open cockpit with two seats side by side, and a position for an observer in the aft fuselage. The Do E could be equipped with a defensive gun or photographic equipment, operated by the observer.

Only four are known to have been completed. Two aircraft with Rolls-Royce Eagle IX engines, known as Do E Is, were exported to Japan and Chile. Two more were built as the Do E II, with Gnome-Rhone Jupiter air-cooled engines. The Do E I was distinguished  from the Wal and the Do E II by having a wing covered with metal panels, instead of fabric.

Dornier registered the two Do E II aircraft for the 1926 German contest for seaplanes, but cancelled their participation shortly before the start.

Specifications (Do E/II)

References

Further reading

Do E
Aircraft first flown in 1924